Third League may refer to the following football leagues:

Third League (Bulgaria)
 Third League of Estonia
 Montenegrin Third League
 TFF Third League of Turkey

It may also refer to Third League of Prizren